Svitlana Vasylivna Pylypenko (sometimes written Svetlana Pilipenko from ; born 14 August 1983) is a Ukrainian former competitive figure skater. She won three medals on the ISU Junior Grand Prix series and competed at three World Junior Championships, achieving her best result, 16th, in 2001. She placed 20th at the 2002 European Championships. After retiring from competition, Pylypenko toured with the Imperial Ice Stars and joined the coaching staff of a skating club in Sochi, Russia.

Programs

Competitive highlights 
JGP: Junior Series / Junior Grand Prix

References

External links 
 

1983 births
Ukrainian female single skaters
Living people
Sportspeople from Kyiv